WordRake is a Seattle-based company that produces editing software of the same name. Gary Kinder — lawyer, New York Times best-selling author, and legal-writing expert — created the WordRake program in 2012. Gary has taught over 1000 writing programs to firms like Jones Day, WilmerHale, Latham & Watkins, Microsoft, KPMG, and NOAA.  

WordRake software is intended to improve the brevity and clarity of writing. It quickly edits business reports, emails, correspondence, briefs, and memoranda to help make them clear and concise.  WordRake is used in over 7000 law firms (its initial market), and in businesses, government agencies, and academia. In January 2013, the City of Seattle announced that it had installed WordRake for use in several municipal departments.
 
Reviews of WordRake have been generally positive while acknowledging the software’s limitations. The program works as an extension to Microsoft Word, with another version for Outlook, and, like automated spelling and grammar checking, WordRake can be prone to false positives.

The second version, WordRake 2, was released in summer 2014. WordRake for Outlook was released in September 2014.  

In 2017, Micah Knapp Produced and Directed a corporate video for WordRake, written by and Exec Produced by Gary Kinder.

References

Software add-ons
Legal software companies
Legal writing
Editing software